Jorge Gomes de Lima, or simply Joreca (7 January 1904 – 5 December 1949) was a Portuguese football manager, journalist and a football referee who made his career in Brazilian football. Started as a radio columnist and commentator, he graduated in Physical Education at the University of São Paulo, in the early 1940s, and began his coaching career in the amateur teams of São Paulo city.

Before becoming a manager, he also served as a referee in professional football, in 1942. In 1943, he was hired by São Paulo and in his first year of his career, he was champion of the Campeonato Paulista. Due to meteoric rise he was invited to coach the Brazil in 1944 (alongside Flávio Costa), in two friendly games against Uruguay, coming out victorious in both matches (4–0 and 6–1). Joreca returned to São Paulo FC where he remained until 1947, winning twice more times the Campeonato Paulista (1945 and 1946).

In 1949 he was hired by Corinthians, and is credited with being largely responsible for discovering Baltazar. He died two months after resigned with Corinthians due to a cardiac arrest, in December 5. He was also an amateur boxer, having won the two fights in which he participated.

Honours

São Paulo FC
Campeonato Paulista:
Winners (3): 1943, 1945, 1946

References

1904 births
1949 deaths
São Paulo FC managers
Sport Club Corinthians Paulista managers
Brazil national football team managers
Expatriate football managers in Brazil
Portuguese expatriate sportspeople in Brazil
Portuguese football managers
Portuguese football referees
Portuguese male boxers